A.K.A. Wham Bam Sam is the forty-seventh studio album by American musician Hank Williams, Jr. This album was released on April 4, 1996, on the Curb Records label.

Track listing
 "Don Juan d'Bubba"  – 2:55
 "Houston, We Have a Problem"  – 3:38
 "It Makes a Good Story"  – 3:19
 "Maybe I'm the One Who's Crazy"  – 3:24
 "Honky Tonked All to Hell"  – 3:00
 "She Don't Do Nothing for Me"  – 3:32
 "Been There, Done That"  – 2:57
 "Let's Keep the Heart in Country"  – 3:45
 "You Won't Mind the Rain"  – 4:20
 "Wham, Bam, Sam"  – 3:34

Personnel
Kenny Aronoff – drums
Eddie Bayers – drums
Chad Cromwell – drums
Paul Franklin – steel guitar
Jimmy Hall – harmonica
Tony Harrell – keyboards
John Hobbs – keyboards
John Jorgenson – electric guitar
Brent Mason – electric guitar
Terry McMillan – harmonica
Steve Nathan – keyboards
Michael Spriggs – acoustic guitar
Neil Thrasher – background vocals
Hank Williams Jr. – lead vocals, background vocals
John Willis – electric guitar
Glenn Worf – bass guitar

Chart performance

External links
 Hank Williams, Jr's Official Website
 Record Label

1996 albums
Hank Williams Jr. albums
Curb Records albums